Vologodsky Uyezd was one of the subdivisions of the Vologda Governorate of the Russian Empire. It was situated in the southwestern part of the governorate. Its administrative centre was Vologda.

Demographics
At the time of the Russian Empire Census of 1897, Vologodsky Uyezd had a population of 172,187. Of these, 99.4% spoke Russian, 0.2% Komi-Zyrian, 0.1% Yiddish, 0.1% German and 0.1% Polish as their native language.

References

 
Uezds of Vologda Governorate
Vologda Governorate